William Thomas Kinkade III (January 19, 1958 – April 6, 2012) was an American painter of popular realistic, pastoral, and idyllic subjects. He is notable for achieving success during his lifetime with the mass marketing of his work as printed reproductions and other licensed products by means of the Thomas Kinkade Company. According to Kinkade's company, one in every twenty American homes owned a copy of one of his paintings. 

Kinkade described himself as a "Painter of Light", a phrase he protected by trademark, but which was earlier used to describe the English artist J. M. W. Turner (1775–1851).

Kinkade was criticized for some of his behavior and business practices; art critics faulted his work for being "kitsch". Kinkade died of "acute intoxication" from alcohol and the drug diazepam at the age of 54.

Early life and education 
William Thomas Kinkade was born on January 19, 1958, in Sacramento County, California. He grew up in the town of Placerville, graduated from El Dorado High School in 1976, and attended the University of California, Berkeley, and Art Center College of Design in Pasadena.

Some of the people who mentored and taught Kinkade prior to college were Charles Bell and Glenn Wessels. Wessels encouraged Kinkade to go to the University of California at Berkeley. Kinkade's relationship with Wessels is the subject of a semi-autobiographical movie released during 2008, Christmas Cottage. After two years of general education at Berkeley, Kinkade transferred to the Art Center College of Design in Pasadena.

Career
During June 1980, Kinkade spent a summer traveling across the United States with his college friend James Gurney. The two of them finished their journey in New York and secured a contract with Guptill Publications to produce a sketching handbook. Two years later they produced a book, The Artist's Guide to Sketching, which was one of Guptill Publications' best-sellers that year.

The success of the book resulted in both working for Ralph Bakshi Studios where they created background art for the 1983 animated feature movie Fire and Ice. While working on the movie, Kinkade began to explore the depiction of light and of imagined worlds.

After the movie, Kinkade worked as a painter, selling his originals in galleries throughout California.

Artistic themes and style

Recurring features of Kinkade's paintings are their pastel colors and brilliant illumination of the scene. Rendered with idealistic values of American scene painting, his works often portray bucolic and idyllic settings such as gardens, streams, stone cottages, lighthouses and Main Streets. His hometown of Placerville (where his works are much displayed) was the inspiration for many of his street and snow scenes. He also depicted various Christian themes including the Christian cross and churches. His country scenes rarely depict people, a point that he frequently received questions about.

Kinkade said he was emphasizing the value of simple pleasures and that his intent was to communicate inspirational messages through his paintings. A self-described "devout Christian" (even giving all four of his children the middle name "Christian"), Kinkade believed he gained his inspiration from his religious beliefs and that his work was intended to include a moral dimension.  Many pictures include specific chapter-and-verse allusions to Bible passages.

In 2009 he painted a portrait of the Indianapolis Motor Speedway for the cover of that year's Indianapolis 500 race program that included details of the crowd, hiding among them the figures of Norman Rockwell and Dale Earnhardt. He also painted the farewell portrait for Yankee Stadium. Concerning the Indianapolis Motor Speedway painting, Kinkade said: 

Artist and Guggenheim Fellow Jeffrey Vallance has spoken about Kinkade's devout religious themes and their reception in the art world:

Essayist Joan Didion is a representative critic of Kinkade's style:

Didion also compared the "Kinkade Glow" to the luminism of 19th-century painter Albert Bierstadt, who sentimentalized the infamous Donner Pass in his Donner Lake from the Summit. Didion saw "unsettling similarities" between the two painters, and worried that Kinkade's treatment of the Sierra Nevada, The Mountains Declare His Glory, similarly ignored the tragedy of the forced dispersal of Yosemite's Sierra Miwok Indians during the Gold Rush, by including an imaginary Miwok camp as what he calls "an affirmation that man has his place, even in a setting touched by God's glory."

Mike McGee, director of the CSUF Grand Central Art Center at California State University, Fullerton, wrote of the Thomas Kinkade Heaven on Earth exhibition:

Authenticity
Kinkade's production method has been described as "a semi-industrial process in which low-level apprentices embellish a prefab base provided by Kinkade." Kinkade reportedly designed and painted all of his works, which were then moved into the next stage of the process of mass-producing prints. It is assumed he created most of the original, conceptual work that he produced. However, he also employed a number of studio assistants to help create multiple prints of his famous oils. Thus while it is believed that Kinkade designed and painted all of his original paintings, the ones collectors were likely to own were printed factory-like and touched up with manual brush strokes by someone other than Kinkade.

Kinkade is reportedly one of the most counterfeited artists, in large part because of advances in affordable, high resolution digital photography and printing technology. Additionally, mass-produced hand-painted fakes from countries such as China and Thailand abound in the U.S. and around the globe. In 2011, the Kinkade studio said that Kinkade was the most collected artist in Asia but received no income from those regions because of widespread forgery.

Business 
Kinkade's works are sold by mail order and in dedicated retail outlets. Some of the prints also feature light effects that are painted onto the print surface by hand by "skilled craftsmen," touches that add to the illusion of light and the resemblance to an original work of art, and which are then sold at greater prices. Licensing with Hallmark and other corporations has made it possible for Kinkade's images to be used extensively for other merchandise such as calendars, jigsaw puzzles, greeting cards, and CDs. By December 2009, his images also appeared on Walmart gift cards.

Kinkade was reported to have earned $53 million for his artistic work during the period 1997 to May 2005. About 2000, there was a national network of several hundred Thomas Kinkade Signature Galleries; however, they began to falter during the late-2000s recession. During June 2010, his Morgan Hill, California manufacturing operation that reproduced the art filed for Chapter 11 bankruptcy protection, listing nearly $6.2 million in creditors' claims. The company, Pacific Metro, planned to reduce its costs by outsourcing much of its manufacturing.

Criticism and controversy

Reception
Although Kinkade was among the most commercially successful painters of the 1990s, his work has been criticized negatively by art critics. Soon after news of Kinkade's death in April 2012, author Susan Orlean termed his passing the death of a "kitsch master". During the same month, journalist Laura Miller lampooned Kinkade's work as "a bunch of garish cottage paintings".

Kinkade was criticized for the extent to which he commercialized his art, for example, by selling his prints on the QVC home shopping network. Some academics expressed concerns about the implications of Kinkade's success in relation to Western perceptions of visual art: in 2009, Nathan Rabin of The A.V. Club wrote, "To his detractors, he represents the triumph of sub-mediocrity and the commercialization and homogenization of painting [...] perhaps no other painter has been as shameless or as successful at transforming himself into a corporation as Kinkade." Among such people, he is known more as a "mall artist" or a "chocolate box artist" than as a merited painter. Rabin later described Kinkade's paintings collectively as "a maudlin, sickeningly sentimental vision of a world where everything is as soothing as a warm cup of hot chocolate with marshmallows on a cold December day".

In a 2001 interview, Kinkade said, "I am really the most controversial artist in the world."

Business practices
Kinkade's company, Media Arts Group Inc., was accused of unfair dealings with owners of Thomas Kinkade Signature Gallery franchises. In 2006, an arbitration board awarded Karen Hazlewood and Jeffrey Spinello $860,000 in damages and $1.2 million in fees and expenses due to Kinkade's company "[failing] to disclose material information" that would have discouraged them from investing in the gallery. The award was later increased to $2.8 million with interest and legal fees. The plaintiffs and other former gallery owners also made accusations of being pressured to open additional galleries that were not viable financially, being forced to accept expensive, unsalable inventory, and being undersold by discount outlets the prices of which they were not allowed to match. Kinkade denied the accusations, and Media Arts Group had defended itself successfully in previous suits by other former gallery owners. Kinkade himself was not singled out in the finding of fraud by the arbitration board. In August 2006, the Los Angeles Times reported that the FBI was investigating these issues, with agents from offices across the country conducting interviews.

Former gallery dealers also charged that the company used Christianity to take advantage of people. "They really knew how to bait the hook," said one ex-dealer who spoke on condition of anonymity. "They certainly used the Christian hook." One former dealer's lawyer stated, "Most of my clients got involved with Kinkade because it was presented as a religious opportunity.  Being defrauded is awful enough, but doing it in the name of God is really despicable." On June 2, 2010, Pacific Metro, the artist's production company, filed for Chapter 11 bankruptcy, one day after defaulting on a $1 million court-imposed payment to the aforementioned Karen Hazlewood and Jeffrey Spinello. A $500,000 payment had been disbursed previously.

From 1997 through 2005, court documents show at least 350 independently owned Kinkade franchises. By May 2005, that number had more than halved. Kinkade received $50 million during this period. An initial cash investment of $80,000 to $150,000 is listed as a startup cost for franchisees.

Personal conduct
The Los Angeles Times reported that some of Kinkade's former colleagues, employees, and even collectors of his work said that he had a long history of cursing and heckling other artists and performers. The Times further reported that he openly fondled a woman's breasts at a South Bend, Indiana sales event, and alleged his proclivity for ritual territory marking by urination, once relieving himself on a Winnie the Pooh figure at the Disneyland Hotel in Anaheim while saying, "This one's for you, Walt." In a letter to licensed gallery owners acknowledging he might have behaved badly during a stressful time when he overindulged in food and drink, Kinkade said accounts of the alcohol-related incidents included "exaggerated, and in some cases outright fabricated personal accusations". The letter did not address any incident specifically.

In 2006, John Dandois, Media Arts Group executive, recounted a story that on one occasion six years previously, Kinkade became drunk at a Siegfried & Roy magic show in Las Vegas and began shouting "Codpiece! Codpiece!" at the performers. Eventually he was calmed by his mother. Dandois also said of Kinkade, "Thom would be fine, he would be drinking, and then all of a sudden, you couldn't tell where the boundary was, and then he became very incoherent, and he would start cussing and doing a lot of weird stuff." In June 2010, Kinkade was arrested in Carmel, California, for driving while under the influence of alcohol. He was later convicted.

Related projects and partnerships 
Kinkade was selected by a number of organizations to celebrate anniversaries, including Disneyland's 50th anniversary, Walt Disney World Resort's 35th anniversary, Elvis Presley's purchase of Graceland 50 years previously and the 25th anniversary of its opening to the public, and Yankee Stadium's farewell 85th season in 2008. Kinkade also paid tribute to Fenway Park.

Kinkade was the artist chosen to depict the historic Biltmore House; he also created the commemorative portrait of the 50th running of the Daytona 500 during 2008.

During 2001, Media Arts unveiled "The Village at Hiddenbrooke," a Kinkade-themed community of homes, built outside of Vallejo, California, in partnership with the international construction company Taylor Woodrow. Salon's Janelle Brown visited the community and found it to be "the exact opposite of the Kinkadeian ideal. Instead of quaint cottages, there's generic tract housing; instead of lush landscapes, concrete patios; instead of a cozy village, there's a bland collection of homes with nothing—- not a church, not a cafe, not even a town square—- to draw them together."

Charities and affiliations
Kinkade donated to non-profit organizations concerned with children, humanitarian relief, and the arts, including the Make-a-Wish Foundation, World Vision, Art for Children Charities, and the Salvation Army. During 2002, he partnered with the Salvation Army to create two charity prints, The Season of Giving and The Light of Freedom. Proceeds from the sale of the prints were donated to the Salvation Army for their relief efforts at the World Trade Center site and to aid the victims of the September 11 attacks and their families in New York City, Pennsylvania, and Washington D.C. More than $2 million was donated as a result of this affiliation.

In 2003, Kinkade was chosen as a National Spokesman for the Make-A-Wish Foundation, and during the 20 Years of Light Tour in 2004, he raised more than $750,000 and granted 12 wishes for children with life-threatening medical conditions.

In 2005, the Points of Light Foundation, a nonprofit organization dedicated to engaging more people more effectively in volunteer service to help solve serious social problems, named Kinkade as "Ambassador of Light". He was the second person in the Foundation's 15-year history to be chosen as Ambassador, the first being the organization's founder, former U.S. President George H. W. Bush. During his Ambassador of Light Tour, Kinkade visited cities nationwide to increase awareness and raise money for the Points of Light Foundation and the Volunteer Center National Network, which serves more than 360 Points of Light member Volunteer Centers in communities across the country.

Archbishop Mitty High School of San Jose dedicated the "Thomas Kinkade Center for the Arts" in 2003.

Kinkade was reportedly a member of the Church of the Nazarene.

Awards and recognition
Kinkade received many awards for his works, including multiple National Association of Limited Edition Dealers (NALED) awards for Artist of the Year and Graphic Artist of the Year, and his art was named Lithograph of the Year nine times.

In 2002, Kinkade was inducted into the California Tourism Hall of Fame as an individual who had influenced the public's perception of tourism in California through his images of California sights. He was selected along with fellow artists Simon Bull and Howard Behrens to commemorate the 2002 Salt Lake City Winter Olympics and the 2002 World Series. He was also honored with the 2002 World Children's Center Humanitarian Award for his contributions to improving the welfare of children and their families through his work with Kolorful Kids and Art for Children.

In 2003, Kinkade was chosen as a national spokesperson for the Make-A-Wish Foundation. In 2004, he was selected for a second time by the Christmas Pageant of Peace to paint the National Christmas Tree in Washington, D.C. The painting, Symbols of Freedom, was the official image for the 2004 Pageant of Peace.

In 2004, Kinkade received an award from NALED recognizing him as the Most Award Winning Artist in the Past 25 Years. In 2005, he was named the NALED Graphic Artist of the Year. He was also recognized for his philanthropic efforts by NALED with the Eugene Freedman Humanitarian Award.

In popular culture
In Heath and Potter's 2004 book The Rebel Sell: Why the Culture Can't Be Jammed, Kinkade's work is described as "so awful it must be seen to be believed". In Dana Spiotta's 2011 novel Stone Arabia, the main character's boyfriend, an art teacher at a private school in Los Angeles, gives her presents of Thomas Kinkade Painter of Light pieces. "When I asked him why Thomas Kinkade, he just said, 'Well, he is America's most successful artist. And a native Californian as well.' Or he would say, 'His name has a trademark — see?' and he would point to the subscript that appeared after his name." The pieces are  "deeply hideous" and "kitschy," but for some reason she  loves them.

Mat Johnson's 2011 novel Pym includes a parody of Kinkade named Thomas Karvel, "the Master of Light".

A self-produced movie about Kinkade, Thomas Kinkade's Christmas Cottage, was released on DVD in late November 2008.  The semi-autobiographical story examines the motivation and inspiration behind his most popular painting, The Christmas Cottage. Jared Padalecki plays Kinkade and Marcia Gay Harden plays his mother. Peter O'Toole plays young Kinkade's mentor, who tells him, "Paint the light, Thomas! Paint the light!."

Bob Odenkirk references Thomas Kinkade on his 2014 comedy album Amateur Hour. On the track "The Kids", Odenkirk includes Kinkade's paintings in a litany of things he encourages his children to appreciate when in reality he wants them to reject when they are older.

In the 2017 movie, The House, with Will Ferrell and Amy Poehler, the suburban casino hides their safe behind a large Thomas Kinkade print.

Personal life 
Kinkade married Nanette Willey in 1982, and the couple had four daughters: Merritt (b. 1988), Chandler (b. 1991), Winsor (b. 1995) and Everett (b. 1997), all named for famous artists. He and his wife had been separated for more than a year before his death in 2012.

Death and legacy
Kinkade died in his Monte Sereno, California, home on April 6, 2012, at age 54. He is buried at Madronia Cemetery in Saratoga, California.

Kinkade's family said initially that he appeared to have died of natural causes.  It was reported after an autopsy that he died of "acute intoxication" from alcohol and diazepam (Valium).  In corroboration with the autopsy, according to Amy Pinto-Walsh, his girlfriend of 20 months, Kinkade had been at home drinking alcohol the night prior to his death. Pinto-Walsh stated that the artist "died in his sleep, very happy, in the house he built, with the paintings he loved, and the woman he loved.”".

After Kinkade's death, his wife sought a restraining order against his girlfriend to prevent her from publicly releasing information and photos with respect to Kinkade, his marriage, his business, and his personal behavior that "would be personally devastating" to Kinkade's wife. By the end of the year, in December 2012, Nanette Kinkade and Amy Pinto-Walsh announced they had reached a private agreement.

See also
 Combellack-Blair House
Jon McNaughton

References

External links

 
 
'Heaven on Earth' for Kinkade fans, Robert L. Pincus, The San Diego Union-Tribune, May 16, 2004
 Landscapes by the Carload: Art or Kitsch?, Tessa DeCarlo, The New York Times, November 7, 1999
 The Kinkade Crusade, Randall Balmer, Christianity Today, December 4, 2000
 'Painter of Light', not right, Joe Brown, Las Vegas Sun, July 2, 2009
 Thomas Kinkade's American Dream The Saturday Evening Post April, 2003
 
 

1958 births
2012 deaths
Painters from California
20th-century American painters
American Christians
Postcard artists
American landscape painters
University of California, Berkeley alumni
Alcohol-related deaths in California

People from Placerville, California
Drug-related deaths in California
People from Sacramento, California
People from Monte Sereno, California
21st-century American painters